Digitonin is a steroidal saponin (saraponin) obtained from the foxglove plant Digitalis purpurea. Its aglycone is digitogenin, a spirostan steroid. It has been investigated as a detergent, as it effectively water-solubilizes lipids.  As such, it has several potential membrane-related applications in biochemistry, including solubilizing membrane proteins, precipitating cholesterol, and permeabilizing cell membranes.

Digitonin is sometimes confused with the cardiac drugs digoxin and digitoxin; all three can be extracted from the same source.

Chemical properties 
 Critical micelle concentration = < 0.5 mM
 Average micellar weight = 70000
 Aggregation number = 60

References 

Spiro compounds
Steroidal glycosides
Saponins